Bobrowniki may refer to the following places:
Bobrowniki in Kuyavian-Pomeranian Voivodeship (north-central Poland)
Bobrowniki, Białystok County in Podlaskie Voivodeship (north-east Poland)
Bobrowniki, Sokółka County in Podlaskie Voivodeship (north-east Poland)
Bobrowniki, Łowicz County in Łódź Voivodeship (central Poland)
Bobrowniki, Pajęczno County in Łódź Voivodeship (central Poland)
Bobrowniki, Sieradz County in Łódź Voivodeship (central Poland)
Bobrowniki, Lublin Voivodeship (east Poland)
Bobrowniki, Świętokrzyskie Voivodeship (south-central Poland)
Bobrowniki, Masovian Voivodeship (east-central Poland)
Bobrowniki, Ostrzeszów County in Greater Poland Voivodeship (west-central Poland)
Bobrowniki, Wągrowiec County in Greater Poland Voivodeship (west-central Poland)
Bobrowniki, Silesian Voivodeship (south Poland)
Bobrowniki, Lubusz Voivodeship (west Poland)
Bobrowniki, Pomeranian Voivodeship (north Poland)
Bobrowniki, West Pomeranian Voivodeship (north-west Poland)